The 2016 Estoril Open (also known as the Millennium Estoril Open for sponsorship purposes) was a tennis tournament played on outdoor clay courts. It was the second edition of the Estoril Open, and part of the ATP World Tour 250 series of the 2016 ATP World Tour. The event took place at the Clube de Ténis do Estoril in Cascais, Portugal, from 25 April – 1 May 2016.

Singles main draw entrants

Seeds

 Rankings are as of April 18, 2016.

Other entrants
The following players received wildcards into the singles main draw:
  Frederico Ferreira Silva
  Pedro Sousa
  Fernando Verdasco

The following players received entry from the qualifying draw:
  Andrea Arnaboldi
  Steven Diez
  Stéphane Robert
  Elias Ymer

Withdrawals
  Gilles Müller → replaced by  Daniel Gimeno-Traver
  Tommy Robredo → replaced by   Benjamin Becker
  Jo-Wilfried Tsonga → replaced by   Michael Berrer
  Dmitry Tursunov → replaced by  Rogério Dutra Silva

Doubles main draw entrants

Seeds

 Rankings are as of April 18, 2016.

Other entrants
The following pairs received wildcards into the doubles main draw:
  Felipe Cunha e Silva /  Frederico Gil
  Kyle Edmund /  Frederico Ferreira Silva

The following pair received entry as alternates:
  Rui Machado /  Pedro Sousa

Withdrawals
Before the tournament
  Marc López (abductor injury)

Champions

Singles

  Nicolás Almagro def.  Pablo Carreño Busta, 6–7(6–8), 7–6(7–5), 6–3

Doubles

  Eric Butorac /  Scott Lipsky def.  Łukasz Kubot /  Marcin Matkowski, 6–4, 3–6, [10–8]

References

External links
 Official website